The McDonough Historic District, in McDonough, Georgia, is a 200-acre (81 ha) historic district which was listed on the National Register of Historic Places in 2007.  It is centered on Griffin St. and Keys Ferry St. and has buildings dating back to 1823.  The district includes 187 contributing buildings, one contributing structure, one contributing site, and a contributing object, as well as 71 non-contributing buildings.

The district includes most of historic McDonough, including the separately NRHP-listed Henry County Courthouse and the courthouse square.

Specifically it includes:

References

External links

Historic districts on the National Register of Historic Places in Georgia (U.S. state)
Victorian architecture in Georgia (U.S. state)
Late 19th and Early 20th Century American Movements architecture
Buildings and structures completed in 1823
Henry County, Georgia